Saat Uchakkey is a 2016 Indian comedy film directed and written by Sanjeev Sharma, starring an ensemble cast of Manoj Bajpayee, Kay Kay Menon, Annu Kapoor, Vijay Raaz, Aditi Sharma, Jatin Sarna and Nitin Bhasin. It was released on 14 October 2016.

Plot
The story follows seven petty crooks, who come together to find a hidden gold treasure buried in a purani haveli in Delhi. Pappi Jaatwala (Manoj Bajpayee) plans the robbery. The film opens in a mental care facility where a young doctor is fascinated by a dangerous inmate called Bichchi (Annu Kapoor), who may have mysterious powers. Bichchi escapes the hospital and is seen in the narrow lanes of old Delhi influencing the robbers, including Pappi. Pappi and his gang embark on the hunt. The team includes Pappi’s girlfriend Sona (Aditi Sharma), Jaggi (Vijay Raaz), Haggu (Nitin Bhasin), Khappe (Aparshakti Khurana), Babbe Tashni (Jatin Sarna), and Phodu (Vipul Vig). Chasing the gang is local cop Tejpal (Kay Kay Menon), who is fond of Sona. Anupam Kher is the demented owner of the haveli.

The gang manages to sneak into the mansion and even spot the gold treasure. However, Bichchi appears there miraculously and poses as god. He hypnotizes the thieves and makes them conscious of their wrongdoings. They all have a change of heart. Tejpal surrenders the treasure to the police station. Pappi wins a lottery worth ₹2 crore and marries Sona.

Cast
Manoj Bajpayee as Pappi Jaatwala
Vijay Raaz as Jaggi Tirchha
Aditi Sharma as Sona
Annu Kapoor as Bichchi
Jatin Sarna as Babbe Tashni
Vipul Vig as Ajji
Aparshakti Khurana as Khappe
Nitin Bhasin as Haggu
Anupam Kher as Diwan
Kay Kay Menon as Tejpal
Lushin Dubey as Sona's mother
 Meysam Eddie as Pamir
Salman Khan as Rehaan Chadha

Soundtrack
The music was composed by Jaidev Kumar, Niranjan Khound, Saket Singh, Bapi-Tutul, Vivek Kar and released by T-Series.

Release
The film was released on 14 October 2016.

References

External links

2016 films
2016 comedy films
Indian comedy films
2010s Hindi-language films
Films scored by Sanjoy Chowdhury
Hindi-language comedy films